Dioscorea pseudomacrocapsa is a species of yam in the family Dioscoreaceae. It occurs in southeastern Brazil, and grows in tropical rainforests.

References

Dioscoreaceae